In mathematics, the Dirichlet convolution is a binary operation defined for arithmetic functions; it is important in number theory. It was developed by Peter Gustav Lejeune Dirichlet.

Definition
If  are two arithmetic functions from the positive integers to the complex numbers, the Dirichlet convolution  is a new arithmetic function defined by:

where the sum extends over all positive divisors d of n, or equivalently over all distinct pairs  of positive integers whose product is n.

This product occurs naturally in the study of Dirichlet series such as the Riemann zeta function. It describes the multiplication of two Dirichlet series in terms of their coefficients:

Properties

The multiplicative identity is the unit function ε defined by  if  and  if .

Specifically, Dirichlet convolution is associative,

distributive over addition
,
commutative,
,
and has an identity element,
  = .

The Dirichlet convolution of two multiplicative functions is again multiplicative, and every not constantly zero multiplicative function has a Dirichlet inverse which is also multiplicative. In other words, multiplicative functions form a subgroup of the group of invertible elements of the Dirichlet ring. Beware however that the sum of two multiplicative functions is not multiplicative (since ), so the subset of multiplicative functions is not a subring of the Dirichlet ring. The article on multiplicative functions lists several convolution relations among important multiplicative functions.

Given a completely multiplicative function , pointwise multiplication by  distributes over Dirichlet convolution: . The convolution of two completely multiplicative functions is multiplicative, but not necessarily completely multiplicative.

Examples

In these formulas, we use the following arithmetical functions:
  is the multiplicative identity: , otherwise 0.
  is the constant function with value 1:   for all . Keep in mind that  is not the identity. (Some authors denote this as  because the associated Dirichlet series is the Riemann zeta function.)
 is the identity function with value n:  .
is the kth power function:  .

The following relations hold:

 , the Dirichlet inverse of the constant function  is the Möbius function. Hence:
  if and only if  , the Möbius inversion formula
, the kth-power-of-divisors sum function σk
, the sum-of-divisors function 
 , the number-of-divisors function 
,  by Möbius inversion of the formulas for σk, σ, and d

 , proved under Euler's totient function
 , by Möbius inversion
  , from convolving 1 on both sides of 
  where λ is Liouville's function
 where Sq = {1, 4, 9, ...} is the set of squares

,  Jordan's totient function

, where  is von Mangoldt's function
 where  is the prime omega function counting distinct prime factors of n
, the characteristic function of the prime powers. 
 where  is the characteristic function of the primes. 

This last identity shows that the prime-counting function is given by the summatory function 

 

This expansion follows from the identity for the sums over Dirichlet convolutions given on the divisor sum identities page (a standard trick for these sums).

Dirichlet inverse

Examples

For :
,  so
. This implies that  does not have a Dirichlet inverse if .

For :
,
,

For :
 ,
 ,

For :
 ,
 ,

Properties

The following properties of the Dirichlet inverse hold:

 The function f has a Dirichlet inverse if and only if . 
 The Dirichlet inverse of a multiplicative function is again multiplicative. 
 The Dirichlet inverse of a Dirichlet convolution is the convolution of the inverses of each function: . 
 A multiplicative function f is completely multiplicative if and only if .
 If f is completely multiplicative then  whenever  and where  denotes pointwise multiplication of functions.

Other formulas

An exact, non-recursive formula for the Dirichlet inverse of any arithmetic function f is given in Divisor sum identities. A more partition theoretic expression for the Dirichlet inverse of f is given by 

The following formula provides a compact way of expressing the Dirichlet inverse of an invertible arithmetic function f :

where the expression  stands for the arithmetic function  convoluted with itself k times. Notice that, for a fixed positive integer , if  then  , this is because  and every way of expressing n as a product of k positive integers must include a 1, so the series on the right hand side converges for every fixed positive integer n.

Dirichlet series
If f is an arithmetic function, the Dirichlet series generating function is defined by

for those complex arguments s for which the series converges (if there are any). The multiplication of Dirichlet series is compatible with Dirichlet convolution in the following sense:

for all s for which both series of the left hand side converge, one of them at least converging 
absolutely (note that simple convergence of both series of the left hand side does not imply convergence of the right hand side!). This is akin to the convolution theorem if one thinks of Dirichlet series as a Fourier transform.

Related concepts

The restriction of the divisors in the convolution to unitary, bi-unitary or infinitary divisors defines similar commutative operations which share many features with the Dirichlet convolution (existence of a Möbius inversion, persistence of multiplicativity, definitions of totients, Euler-type product formulas over associated primes, etc.).

Dirichlet convolution is the convolution of the incidence algebra for the positive integers ordered by divisibility.

See also

 Arithmetic function
 Divisor sum identities
 Möbius inversion formula

References

External links
 

Arithmetic functions
Bilinear maps

de:Zahlentheoretische Funktion#Faltung